Juan Francisco Brunetta (born 12 May 1997) is an Argentine professional footballer who plays as an attacking midfielder for Liga MX club Santos Laguna, on loan from Godoy Cruz.

Club career
Brunetta's youth career started with Boca Juniors, he remained there between 2006 and 2009 when he joined the ranks of Estudiantes and subsequently Arsenal de Sarandí. He was promoted into the first-team squad of the latter for the 2016–17 Argentine Primera División season. He made his Arsenal debut on 13 September in a home loss to Atlético Tucumán. Four matches later, versus Banfield, Brunetta scored his first career goal. Brunetta signed a new three-year contract with Arsenal in January 2017. However, in August, Brunetta joined Belgrano. His first match came in the Copa Argentina against Defensores de Belgrano.

On 15 June 2019, having suffered relegation with Belgrano, Brunetta was announced as a new signing for Godoy Cruz ahead of 2019–20. He scored six goals, including braces over Gimnasia y Esgrima and Patronato, across twenty-three total appearances for the club. On 3 October 2020, Brunetta headed to Italian football after he was loaned to Serie A's Parma for an initial two-year term. The deal included an obligation to buy, which would come into effect at the conclusion of the loan as the attacking midfielder agreed a contract until 2025. He scored twice on his first start, netting against Cosenza in the Coppa Italia fourth round on 25 November.

On 23 June 2022, Brunetta was loaned to Santos Laguna for a season, with an option to buy.

International career
Brunetta was selected by Julio Olarticoechea for Argentina U20s training in July 2016.

Career statistics

Honours
Argentina U23
Pre-Olympic Tournament: 2020

References

External links

1997 births
Living people
Sportspeople from Córdoba Province, Argentina
Argentine footballers
Association football midfielders
Argentine expatriate footballers
Expatriate footballers in Italy
Argentine expatriate sportspeople in Italy
Expatriate footballers in Mexico
Argentine expatriate sportspeople in Mexico
Argentine Primera División players
Serie A players
Serie B players
Boca Juniors footballers
Estudiantes de La Plata footballers
Arsenal de Sarandí footballers
Club Atlético Belgrano footballers
Godoy Cruz Antonio Tomba footballers
Parma Calcio 1913 players
Santos Laguna footballers